"Living In Fast Forward" is a song written by David Lee Murphy and Rivers Rutherford, and recorded by American country music singer Kenny Chesney that reached the top of the Billboard Hot Country Songs chart.  It was released in January 2006 as the second single from Chesney's album The Road and the Radio. It is also featured as a selectable track on the Hollywood Rip Ride Rockit roller coaster at Universal Studios Florida.

Background and content
Chesney says the song "defines how I've lived my life in the last several years. Because it has happened so quick. And I say it's happened so quick. I mean, I've been doing it for 12 years. But the last four to five years, it's been an amazing thing to live through and to see happen to you and to see your fan base grow to a point where it's unbelievable to stand in front of that microphone every night and see how passionate they are about your music. ... More importantly, how much fun they're having with it ... out in the parking lots before the show and during the show. It's everything I ever dreamed of and more."

Music video
The music video was directed by Shaun Silva and premiered on CMT on December 1, 2005. This video was filmed on tour, but while the former shows the actual show, this one is more of the behind-the-scenes.

Chart positions
"Living in Fast Forward" debuted at number 54 on the U.S. Billboard Hot Country Songs chart for the week of November 19, 2005.

Year-end charts

Certifications

References

2006 singles
2005 songs
Kenny Chesney songs
Songs written by David Lee Murphy
Songs written by Rivers Rutherford
Music videos directed by Shaun Silva
Song recordings produced by Buddy Cannon
BNA Records singles